Erith is an area of south-east London.

Erith may also refer to:

Associated with the London area
 Municipal Borough of Erith (18761975)
 Erith and Crayford (UK Parliament constituency), 19551997
 Erith and Thamesmead (UK Parliament constituency), since 1997
 Erith railway station
 Erith & Belvedere F.C., a football club playing at Park View Road
 Erith Town F.C., a football club playing at Erith Sports Stadium

Other meanings
 Erith Island, off Tasmania, Australia
 Erith, South Australia
 Raymond Erith (1904–1973), English architect

See also
 Earith, Cambridgeshire, England, a village